Sukanya Srisurat (born 3 May 1995) is a Thai weightlifter competing in the 58 kg category and representing Thailand at international competitions. She competed at world championships, including at the 2015 World Weightlifting Championships.

She was sanctioned for using the doping Methandienone.

Major results

CWR: Current world record
WR: World record

References

External links
 
 
 
 

1995 births
Living people
Sukanya Srisurat
Doping cases in weightlifting
Weightlifters at the 2016 Summer Olympics
Sukanya Srisurat
Sukanya Srisurat
Medalists at the 2016 Summer Olympics
Olympic medalists in weightlifting
Sukanya Srisurat
World Weightlifting Championships medalists
Universiade medalists in weightlifting
Sukanya Srisurat
Southeast Asian Games medalists in weightlifting
Asian Games medalists in weightlifting
Weightlifters at the 2018 Asian Games
Medalists at the 2018 Asian Games
Sukanya Srisurat
Competitors at the 2013 Southeast Asian Games
Universiade silver medalists for Thailand
Sukanya Srisurat